Kinds of Kings is a US-based composer collective. Founded in 2017 by composers Gemma Peacocke and Shelley Washington, all three of the collective's members are alumnae of the NYU Steinhardt Master's composition program, and studied under composers and Bang on a Can founders Julia Wolfe and Michael Gordon. The collective's members are Peacocke,  Washington, and Maria Kaoutzani. Called "distinguished young creators who work in diverse styles" by The New Yorker, the organization focuses on amplifying and advocating for under-heard voices and producing immersive and inclusive work.

Notable performances
The collective has had portrait concerts with the St. Louis Symphony Orchestra's Pulitzer series,  New York's Metropolis Ensemble, Roulette Intermedium, and an Artist Residency with National Sawdust.

Bouman Fellowship

In 2019, Kinds of Kings began its Bouman Fellowship for emerging composers. Named after computer scientist Katie Bouman, the program commissions new pieces by young composers to be premiered at major venues alongside pieces by the Kinds of Kings composers.

References

External links
Kinds of Kings official website

Musical groups established in 2017
Musical groups from New York City
2017 establishments in New York (state)